Convicts 4, also known as Reprieve, is a 1962 American neo noir crime film starring Ben Gazzara and directed by Millard Kaufman. The film is a fictionalized version of the life of death row convict John Resko, who wrote his autobiography: Reprieve.

The film was initially released as Reprieve to "poor box office," and was released again as Convicts 4, also without commercial success.

Factual background 
On February 5, 1931, Resko and an accomplice, Frank Mayo, killed a grocer, Samuel Friedberg, during an attempted robbery of his store at 885 East 167th Street in the Bronx. Resko confessed to the crime. Both men were sentenced to death, and the jury recommended clemency for Resko, who was 19 and had a wife and infant daughter. The jury recommended clemency, with the foreman saying that he was a tool "in the hands of a hardened criminal." Resko's sentence was commuted by then-Governor Franklin D. Roosevelt to life imprisonment after he testified against Mayo, who was executed on July 21, 1932.

Resko became a noted artist while in prison and was freed shortly before Christmas 1949 by Governor Thomas E. Dewey. The film mixes fact with fiction, turning the killing into a crime of passion.

Plot 
It is Christmas, 1931, and John Resko (Ben Gazzara) wants to give his baby daughter a new teddy bear. He goes, without money, into a shop and tries to get the shopkeeper to give it to him saying he will pay him later. The prosperous shopkeeper, who cleans his eyeglasses with a dollar bill, refuses. Resko grabs a gun he saw in the till and points it at the man. The shopkeeper lunges at Resko and is shot. Resko is condemned to the electric chair at the age of eighteen.

Pardoned by the governor at the last minute, Resko is sentenced to Dannemora Prison, where he has difficulty adjusting to life behind bars. It becomes even less bearable after hearing that his wife (Carmen Phillips) has left him and that his father (Jack Kruschen) has died while rescuing a drowning child to make up for the life that was lost.

Resko attempts to escape twice, and does long stretches in solitary confinement. But he is befriended eventually by fellow convicts like Iggy (Ray Walston) and Wino (Sammy Davis Jr.) who help him to pass the time. When he takes up art as a hobby, Resko's work is seen by an art critic, Carl Carmer (Vincent Price), who believes him to have promise.

In 1949, after 18 years in prison, Resko is released. His daughter (Susan Silo) and granddaughter are waiting when he gets out.

Cast
 Ben Gazzara as John Resko 
 Stuart Whitman as Principal Keeper 
 Ray Walston as Iggy 
 Vincent Price as Carl Carmer 
 Rod Steiger as 'Tiptoes' 
 Broderick Crawford as Warden 
 Dodie Stevens as Resko's Sister 
 Jack Kruschen as Resko's Father 
 Sammy Davis Jr. as Wino 
 Naomi Stevens as Resko's Mother 
 Carmen Phillips as Connie Resko 
 Susan Silo as Cathy (as an adult) 
 Timothy Carey as Nick 
 Roland La Starza as Duke 
 Tom Gilson as Lefty
 Jack Albertson as Art teacher

Production
Resko was technical advisor of the film, whose prison sequences were filmed at Folsom State Prison. Sammy Davis Jr. put on a show for the actual inmates after filming.

Critical reception and legacy 
New York Times critic A.H. Weiler said the film "is forthright and serious in its attempt to limn a striking figure but is only rarely compelling or memorable."

The New York Daily News gave the film three of four stars, and called the film "commendable" even though failed to substantiate its premise that becoming a good artist means that one is a "rehabilitated soul." The convicts are sympathetically portrayed as "sympathetic at heart and good for occasional laughs."

Although the film did not find an audience in the theaters, it was played often on late-night television, and is included in the 2008 anthology, 101 Forgotten Films.

See also
 List of American films of 1962

References

External links 
 
  
 
 

1962 films
1960s biographical drama films
1962 crime drama films
American crime drama films
American biographical drama films
American black-and-white films
Neo-noir
1960s prison films
Films scored by Leonard Rosenman
Films based on biographies
Films based on non-fiction books
Films set in the 1930s
Films set in the 1940s
Films set in New York (state)
American prison drama films
1960s English-language films
1960s American films